Im Soo-jung (born July 11, 1979) is a South Korean actress. After modeling for teen magazines, Im made her acting breakthrough in Kim Jee-woon's horror film A Tale of Two Sisters (2003), followed by the popular television drama I'm Sorry, I Love You (2004). She has since appeared in numerous films, notably Park Chan-wook's I'm a Cyborg, But That's OK (2006), Hur Jin-ho's Happiness (2007), Lee Yoon-ki's Come Rain, Come Shine (2011), and Min Kyu-dong's All About My Wife, for which she won Best Actress at the 33rd Blue Dragon Film Awards.

Career 
Im Soo-jung made her debut in 1998 as a cover model for teen magazines. She then moved onto acting and debuted in the teen drama School 4, but it was Kim Jee-woon's 2003 stylish horror A Tale of Two Sisters that first drew her critical notice and newcomer awards. A year later, the hit KBS2 drama series I'm Sorry, I Love You catapulted her into stardom. With Im looking much younger than her age, those projects solidified her image as an eternal ingenue, as did touching character study ...ing, horse jockey film Lump Sugar, and Park Chan-wook's surrealist I'm a Cyborg, But That's OK.

In recent years she began shedding that image by taking on more adult roles, notable among them Hur Jin-ho's romantic melodrama Happiness, Choi Dong-hoon's blockbuster fantasy Jeon Woo-chi: The Taoist Wizard, romantic comedy Finding Mr. Destiny, and Lee Yoon-ki's minimalist breakup indie Come Rain, Come Shine. For her performance in All About My Wife, she won Best Actress at the Blue Dragon Film Awards, and the Women in Film Korea Awards.

Im and Lee Jung-jae played two artists in a post-apocalyptic environment in the short film El Fin del Mundo ("The End of the World"), which screened at the prestigious contemporary art exhibition dOCUMENTA. She also acted opposite veteran Thai actor Sorapong Chatree in Aditya Assarat's short film Phuket, which was commissioned jointly by the Ministry of Foreign Affairs and the Association of Tourism and Hotel Operators of Phuket.

Im was previously part of the SidusHQ agency, but moved to being managed by KeyEast. KeyEast launched her official website in June 2012. According to the actress, the online space will be a place where she can converse with her fans directly.

In 2015, Im starred in Perfect Proposal, a remake of British crime thriller Woman of Straw that was partly shot in Macau. She next starred in Time Renegades, a time-hopping romantic thriller where she played dual roles.

In October 2015, her contract with KeyEast expired and she decided to sign with new management agency YNK Entertainment.

Im then starred in the female-centric indie film The Table directed by Kim Jong-kwan, which premiered at the 21st Busan International Film Festival.

In February 2017, Im was cast in the drama Chicago Typewriter alongside Yoo Ah-in. This marks Im's small screen come back after thirteen years since 2004. The same year, she was named the cultural ambassador for the UK-Korea Creative Futures mutual exchange.

She then returned to the big screen with Mothers based on the book Your Request - My Other Mother by Lee Dong-eun, who also directs the film.

In 2019, Im returned to the small screen with the series Search: WWW.

In 2020, Im joined the film Single in Seoul with Lee Dong-wook.

In 2021, Im starred in the tvN drama Melancholia alongside Lee Do-hyun.

In 2022, Im contract with King Kong by Starship expires in August, and decided not to renew the contract.

Personal life

She is a vegan and an advocate of animal rights.

Filmography

Film

Television series

Music video

Awards and nominations

References

External links 

South Korean film actresses
South Korean television actresses
21st-century South Korean actresses
Actresses from Seoul
1979 births
Living people